Elotepec Zapotec (Zapoteco de San Juan Elotepec) is a Zapotec language of a single village in western Oaxaca, Mexico, San Juan Elotepec in the Municipio of Villa Sola de Vega. It is one of several Zapotec languages called Papabuco, and has 68% intelligibility of Zaniza Zapotec.

INALI, the National Institute of Indigenous Languages of Mexico, and the Documenting Endangered Languages Program of the National Science Foundation have funded the creation of an online archive of Elotepec Zapotec.

References

Sources

External links 
OLAC resources in and about the Elotepec Zapotec language

Zapotec languages